The 2017–18 Penn State Nittany Lions basketball team represented Pennsylvania State University in the 2017–18 NCAA Division I men's basketball season. They are led by head coach Pat Chambers, in his seventh season with the team, and played their home games at the Bryce Jordan Center in University Park, Pennsylvania as members of the Big Ten Conference. They finished the season 26–13, 9–9 in Big Ten play to finish in a tie for sixth place. In the Big Ten tournament, they defeated Northwestern and Ohio State before losing to Purdue in the semifinals. They received a bid to the National Invitation Tournament where they defeated Temple, Notre Dame, Marquette, and Mississippi State to advance to the NIT championship where they defeated Utah to become NIT champions.

Previous season
The Nittany Lions finished the 2016–17 season 15–18, 6–12 in Big Ten play to finish in a tie for 12th place. As the No. 13 seed in the Big Ten tournament, they beat Nebraska in the first round before losing to Michigan State in the second round.

Offseason

Departures

2017 recruiting class

2018 recruiting class

Personnel

Roster

Coaching Staff

Schedule and results
The 2018 Big Ten tournament was held at Madison Square Garden in New York City. Due to the Big East's use of that venue for their conference tournament, the Big Ten tournament took place one week earlier than usual, ending the week before Selection Sunday. 

|-
!colspan=9 style=|Bahamas exhibition trip

|-
!colspan=9 style=|Exhibition

|-
!colspan=9 style=|Regular season

|-
!colspan=9 style=|Big Ten tournament

|-
!colspan=9 style=|NIT

References

Penn State Nittany Lions basketball seasons
Penn State
Penn State
Penn State
Penn State
National Invitation Tournament championship seasons